Keri-anne Payne (born 9 December 1987), also known by her married name Keri-anne Carry, is a South African-born British swimmer, specialising in marathon open water swimming, and long-distance freestyle swimming in the pool.  She is a two-time 10-kilometre open water world champion, and an Olympic silver medallist.

Swimming career
Payne was born on 9 December 1987 in Johannesburg, South Africa, to British parents, who registered her birth at the British Consulate. She started swimming aged 4, and was noticed aged 8 by British Swimming's national performance director Bill Sweetenham at a training camp in South Africa. As a result, the family returned to the UK to live in Heywood, Greater Manchester, when she was 13.

Payne attended Cardinal Langley Roman Catholic High School. Joining Stockport Metro, she has been coached since by Sean Kelly. Having broken the British junior 800-metre freestyle record in 2002, Payne's central financial support was cut after she failed to win a medal at the 2006 Commonwealth Games. As a result, Kelly suggested that she try open water swimming, allowing her to access additional central funding.

At the 2008 Summer Olympics in Beijing, she competed in the 200-metre individual medley and 400-metre individual medley swimming events, as well as the 10-kilometre open water event, in which she placed second and won a silver medal.

At the 2009 World Aquatics Championships, held in Rome, Payne won the 10-kilometre open water event. She finished first in a time of two hours, one minute and 37.1 seconds.

In 2011 in Shanghai, Payne reclaimed the World Championship in the 10 km open water event, becoming in the process the first British athlete in any sport to confirm qualification for the 2012 Summer Olympics. She took part in the 10-kilometre open water event at the 2012 Summer Olympics in London, and finished fourth, four seconds behind the winner.

Payne trained at British Swimming's Intensive Training Centre at Stockport's Grand Central Pools. There she met fellow swimmer David Carry, whom she married on 15 September 2012 at Craigiebuckler Church, Aberdeen. The couple had lived in Heywood, Greater Manchester. However, due to Carry's retirement from competitive swimming and in preparation for the 2014 Commonwealth Games in Glasgow, after their wedding they relocated to Edinburgh, where Payne joined Warrender Baths Club.

In 2014, she won the LEN European Open Water Swimming Cup Super Final in Castellabate, Italy.

In January 2017 Payne announced her retirement from competitive swimming 

Starting in January 2018, Payne will be co-presenting The Wave on UKTV channel W.

See also
 List of Olympic medalists in swimming (women)
 List of World Aquatics Championships medalists in swimming (women)
 List of Commonwealth Games medallists in swimming (women)

References

External links
 
 Team GB Olympic profile
 British Swimming profile

1987 births
Living people
English female swimmers
Female long-distance swimmers
Olympic swimmers of Great Britain
Swimmers at the 2008 Summer Olympics
Olympic silver medallists for Great Britain
Sportspeople from Johannesburg
British female freestyle swimmers
Female medley swimmers
Swimmers at the 2012 Summer Olympics
People from Heywood, Greater Manchester
Medalists at the 2008 Summer Olympics
World Aquatics Championships medalists in open water swimming
Commonwealth Games bronze medallists for England
Swimmers at the 2016 Summer Olympics
Olympic silver medalists in swimming
Swimmers at the 2010 Commonwealth Games
Commonwealth Games medallists in swimming
Sportspeople from Rochdale
Medallists at the 2010 Commonwealth Games